Cerithiopsis petala is a species of sea snail, a gastropod in the family Cerithiopsidae. It was described by Dall, in 1927.

Description 
The maximum recorded shell length is 5 mm.

Habitat 
Minimum recorded depth is 805 m. Maximum recorded depth is 805 m.

References

petala
Gastropods described in 1927